Cadet's fuming liquid was a red-brown oily liquid prepared in 1760 by the French chemist Louis Claude Cadet de Gassicourt (1731-1799) by the reaction of potassium acetate with arsenic trioxide. It consisted mostly of dicacodyl (((CH3)2As)2) and cacodyl oxide (((CH3)2As)2O). 

The global reaction (mass balance) corresponding to the oxide formation is the following:

 

These were the first organometallic substances prepared; as such, Cadet has been regarded as the father of organometallic chemistry.

This liquid develops white fumes when exposed to air, resulting in a pale flame producing carbon dioxide, water, and arsenic trioxide. It has a nauseating and very disagreeable garlic-like odor.

Around 1840, Robert Bunsen did much work on characterizing the compounds in the liquid and its derivatives. His research was important in the development of radical theory.

References

Organometallic chemistry
Organoarsenic compounds
Chemical mixtures